Francis Johnson was an Oxford academic and administrator. He was Master of University College, Oxford.<ref>Carr, William, University College], Routledge, 1998. . Chapter VI, [https://books.google.com/books?id=hzBc2Ur_9YIC&pg=PA95&vq=Francis+Johnson The Seventeenth Century to the Restoration, 1660'.</ref>

Johnson was Master during the Commonwealth of England. On 5 May 1660, Charles II was declared King in the Restoration. On 1 August 1660, Johnson had to defend his position as Master of University College. He stated "hee was putt in Master there by Oliver Lord Protector and the Lords and Commons''" [sic]. Johnson's protestations were to no avail and he was replaced by Thomas Walker, who had been Master previously before the Commonwealth. Shortly after, Thomas Radcliffe, Obadiah Walker, and Abraham Woodhead, who had been expelled from the College in 1648, were reinstated, and four of the current Fellows were expelled.

References 

Year of birth missing
Year of death missing
17th-century English people
Fellows of University College, Oxford
Masters of University College, Oxford